was a town located in Shūsō District, Ehime Prefecture, Japan.

As of 2003, the town had an estimated population of 9,668 and a density of 126.78 persons per km2. The total area was 76.26 km2.

On November 1, 2004, Komatsu, along with the city of Tōyo, and the town of Tanbara (also from Shūsō District), was merged into the expanded city of Saijō and no longer exists as an independent municipality.

External links
Official website of Saijo

Dissolved municipalities of Ehime Prefecture
Saijō, Ehime